Neoclytus modestus is a species of beetle in the family Cerambycidae. It was described by Fall in 1907.

References

Neoclytus
Beetles described in 1907